G. Udayagiri is a Vidhan Sabha constituency of Kandhamal district, Odisha.

Area of this constituency includes G. Udayagiri, G. Udayagiri block, Daringbadi block, Tikabali block and Raikia block.

In 2009 election, Bharatiya Janata Party candidate Manoj Kumar Pradhan defeated Indian National Congress candidate Ajayanti Pradhan by a margin of 23,935 votes.

Elected Members

16 elections held during 1951 to 2019. Elected members from the G. Udayagiri constituency are:
2019: (83): Saluga Pradhan (BJD)
2014: (83): Jacob Pradhan (Congress)
2009: (83): Manoj Pradhan (BJP)
2004: (103): Ajayanti Pradhan (Congress)
2000: (103): Saluga Pradhan (BJD)
1995: (103): Nagarjuna Pradhan (Congress)
1990: (103): Nagarjuna Pradhan (Congress)
1985: (103): Nagarjuna Pradhan (Congress)
1980: (103): Nagarjuna Pradhan (Congress-I)
1977: (103): Ranjit Kumar Pradhan (Janata Party)
1974: (103): Gopal Pradhan (Congress)
1971: (96): Gopal Pradhan (Swatantra)
1967: (96): Gopal Pradhan (Swatantra)
1961: (30): Sarangadhar Pradhan (Congress)
1957: (24): Sarangadhar Pradhan (Ganatantra Parishad)
1951: (11): Sadananda Sahu (Independent)

Election results

2019

2014
In 2014 election, Indian National Congress candidate Jacob Pradhan defeated Biju Janata Dal candidate Pradeep Kumar Pradhan by a margin of 10,289 votes.

2009

Notes

References

Assembly constituencies of Odisha
Kandhamal district